Mullaghcleevaun at , is the 15th–highest peak in Ireland on the Arderin scale, and the 20th–highest peak on the Vandeleur-Lynam scale. Mullaghcleevaun is in the central sector of the Wicklow Mountains range, in Wicklow, Ireland; it is the 2nd highest peak in Wicklow after Lugnaquilla.  Mullaghcleevaun lies on the main "central spine" of the whole range that runs from Kippure in the north, to Lugnaquillia in the south; and in particular, it lies on the continuous "central boggy ridge" that runs from the Sally Gap to Tonelagee.

To the east of the main summit of Mullaghcleevaun is Mullaghcleevaun East Top .

Naming
According to Irish academic Paul Tempan, Patrick Weston Joyce notes that Mullaghcleevaun was named after a "cradle-like depression near the top, presumably the one occupied by Cleevaun Lough".

Geography 
Mullaghcleevaun is the 2nd highest peak in the Wicklow Mountains, and is situated in the central sector of the whole range, on the western edge overlooking the Poulaphouca Reservoir (also called the "Blessington Lakes").

Mullaghcleevaun's flat summit is visible from other peaks in the range, and its massif also includes the subsidiary summit of Mullaghcleevaun East Top , whose prominence of  qualifies it as Hewitt. To the south-east of Mullaghcleevaun East Top is the summit of Carrigshouk , whose prominence of  qualifies it as an Arderin. Further away on Mullaghcleevaun's larger massif is Duff Hill , which lies to the north.

Mullaghcleevaun's most distinctive feature is its deep northern corrie, which contains Wicklow's highest natural lake, Lough Cleevaun .

Mullaghcleevaun's southeastern slopes are the source of the Glenmacnass River which flows down the Glenmacnass Waterfall into the Glenmacnass Valley and on to Laragh.

Hill walking 
A common route to the summit of Mullaghcleevaun is from the south via an 8.5-kilometre 3-4 hour walk which starts from a small car-park in the forest below Carraigshouk  (the car-park is known locally as "The Oasis") just off the R115 road (also called the Old Military Road).  This southerly route ascends to Mullaghcleevaun East Top and then to the summit of Mullaghcleevaun, before retracing to the car-park.

A similar distance route can be done from the north starting at the car-park at Ballynultagh Gap, which lies between Black Hill and Sorrel Hill).

A longer undertaking is the complete north-east to south-west "boggy ridge" that runs from the Sally Gap to Carrigvore , and then on to Gravale , and then after a col, the ridge continues south-westwards to meet Duff Hill , and then on to Mullaghcleevaun East Top and Mullaghcleevaun itself.  Getting from the Sally Gap to Mullaghcleevan is itself an 8.5-kilometre 3-4 hour walk, which some hill walkers avoid having to completely retrace back to the Sally Gap, and thus completing a 7-hour walk, by instead using two cars.

Gallery

Bibliography

See also

Wicklow Way
Wicklow Round
Wicklow Mountains
Lists of mountains in Ireland
List of mountains of the British Isles by height
List of Marilyns in the British Isles
List of Hewitt mountains in England, Wales and Ireland

References

External links
MountainViews: The Irish Mountain Website, Mullaghcleevaun
MountainViews: Irish Online Mountain Database
The Database of British and Irish Hills , the largest database of British Isles mountains ("DoBIH")
Hill Bagging UK & Ireland, the searchable interface for the DoBIH

Marilyns of Ireland
Mountains and hills of County Wicklow
Hewitts of Ireland
Mountains under 1000 metres